Staffan Valdemar Holm (born 7 October 1958 in Tomelilla, Skåne) is a Swedish-German theatre director. 

Staffan Valdemar Holm was trained at Statens Teaterskole in Copenhagen, Denmark. He was 
managing director of the Royal Dramatic Theatre in Stockholm, Sweden, 2002-08. 

Staffan Valdemar Holm is from 2011 managing director (Generalintendent) of Düsseldorfer Schauspielhaus in Düsseldorf, Germany.

References

Living people
1958 births
Swedish theatre directors
German theatre directors
Litteris et Artibus recipients